The Enclosure of the executed is a small cemetery, located at the Rue Colonel Bourg in the Brussels municipality of Schaerbeek, where 365 resistance fighters of both world wars are buried.

The field of honour is located where the national shooting range previously was located. Nowadays, it lies on the plot of several media networks, including the Flemish Radio and Television Broadcasting Organisation and the Belgian Radio and television of the French Community, between the terrains of RTBF and the kindergarten of RTBF.

During the First World War, the shooting range was seized by the German forces who executed thirty-five people on the location, including Jozef Baeckelmans, Philippe Baucq, Louis Bril, Edith Cavell, and Gabrielle Petit. During the Second World War, 261 more people were executed by German soldiers, including Youra Livchitz, known for stopping a Holocaust train, saving dozens of Jews transported to Auschwitz concentration camp. After the war, the turf where they were buried was rebaptised to a memorial site.

Thirty-eight graves are of unknown individuals. A memorial commemorates the thirty-five executed individuals during the First World War. In 1970, another monument was established, honouring the unknown Belgian political prisoners of the Second World War. It exists of a high burial column and an urn with relics of victims of the concentration camps.

Every last Sunday of April, an official ceremony is organised honouring the prisoners of the concentration camps of the Second World War, in the presence of the highest dignitaries of Belgium.

The burial site is part of the protected immovable heritage of Schaerbeek since 12 January 1983.

Buried or commemorated at the enclosure
  (1881–1915), architect of several mansions of the Antwerp Zurenborg area, drafted reports regarding train traffic as a resistance member. Together with his friend Alexander Franck, he was the first one to be exectuted at the shooting range.
  (1880–1915), architect and member of the network of Edith Cavell which helped wounded allied soldiers escape to the neutral Netherlands. Executed at the same time as Cavell, in order to quell the international protest.
 Arthur Hellmann (1906–1944), tailor who was involved in the resistance movement during the Second World War. As a Jew himself, he participated in an attack against a transport of Jews, and organised an armed attack at the hospital of Tienen, which resulted in the escape of a few resistance fighters. Arrested on 2 June 1943, incarcerated in Mechelen prison, then Breendonk prison camp, where he was executed.

References

Schaerbeek
World War I memorials in Belgium
World War I cemeteries
World War II memorials in Belgium
World War II cemeteries
World War II sites in Belgium
World War I sites in Belgium
Execution sites